Benjamin Cooper   was an English politician who sat in the House of Commons from 1621 to 1624.

Cooper was probably the son of Benjamin Cooper. He was admitted at Emmanuel College, Cambridge on 16 May 1612. He was an alderman of Yarmouth.  In 1621, he was elected Member of Parliament for Great Yarmouth. He was re-elected MP for Yarmouth in 1624.

References

Year of birth missing
Year of death missing
Alumni of Emmanuel College, Cambridge
People from Great Yarmouth
English MPs 1621–1622
English MPs 1624–1625